Black Box – Wax Trax! Records: The First 13 Years is a box set album compiling songs released on Wax Trax! Records between 1980 and 1993. Black Box commemorates Wax Trax!'s output as an independent record label prior to its purchase by TVT Records. In particular, Black Box celebrates Wax Trax!'s place as the seminal American industrial label, featuring acts such as Ministry (and its numerous side projects), KMFDM, Meat Beat Manifesto, Coil, Laibach, and many others.

Black Box is notable for containing the Trent Reznor Vocal Version of 1000 Homo DJs' "Supernaut". Reznor's vocal recording was not used on the original Wax Trax! release because of pressure from his then-current record label—conspicuously, TVT Records. Absent from Black Box is the work of Front 242, whose releases on Wax Trax! (originally licensed from Play It Again Sam) are not represented because of disputes with Epic Records, which had recently obtained the rights to Front 242's catalogue.

A numbered limited edition run of 10,000 of this box set was also released. The packaging was an electroplated galvanized steel box, enclosed in a black nylon mesh that was tied off at each end by heavy gauge metal wire. A card that had information about the release, including the limited edition numbering, was attached to the packaging via a wire tie. The top lid was stamped with the "Black Box" logo. Inside the packaging were the following items (stacked from top to bottom in this order): a single sided poster, the information booklet (the same that was included in the regular release), disc 1, a coaster with the "Black Box" logo on it, disc 2, a "Black Box" patch, disc 3, and a postcard you could mail in for a free catalogue from Wax Trax! / TVT. All of this sat on a bedding of "69 feet of audio tape outtakes". Each of the three CDs came in their own opaque black jewel case that had no printing on it.

A pair of companion VHS tapes were released in conjunction with the CD release.

Track listing

Disc one
"Supernaut (Trent Reznor Vocal Version)" – 1000 Homo DJs
"No Devotion" – Revolting Cocks
"Beers, Steers and Queers (12" Version)" – Revolting Cocks
"Addiction" – Sister Machine Gun
"Violent Peace" – Excessive Force
"Envoyé (12" Version)" – The Young Gods
"I Will Refuse (12" Version)" – Pailhead
"Faster Than Light" – Lead into Gold
"Digital Tension Dementia" – Front Line Assembly
"Your God Is Dead" – Mussolini Headkick
"Now Is the Time" – Greater Than One
"Shit for Brains" – PIG
"Cop Out" – Peter Hope and Richard H. Kirk
"Atomic Dog" – Wreck
"Elephant's Graveyard (12" Version)" – Strike Under

Disc two
"Stowaway" – Chris Connelly
"Come Down Here" – Chris Connelly
"Love's Secret Domain" – Coil
"The Snow (Answers Come In Dreams II Version)" – Coil
"The Hacker" – Clock DVA
"Virus (12" Version)" – KMFDM
"Godlike (12" Version)" – KMFDM
"Every Day (Is Halloween) (Original 12" Version)" – Ministry
"Rigor Mortis" – A Split Second
"Butterfly Potion (12" Version)" – Foetus
"Father Don't Cry" – Doubting Thomas
"Nothing Stays" – Cyberaktif
"Words (Of The Dying)" – Controlled Bleeding
"Compulsion" – In The Nursery

Disc three
"Rubber Glove Seduction (12" Version)" – PTP
"No Name, No Slogan (12" Version)" – Acid Horse
"What Time Is Love? (12" Version)" – The KLF
"Silicon Jesus (Duality Mix)" – Psykosonik
"Cuz It's Hot (12" Version)" – My Life with the Thrill Kill Kult
"Do You Fear (for Your Child)" – My Life with the Thrill Kill Kult
"Geburt Einer Nation" – Laibach
"God O.D." – Meat Beat Manifesto
"Mindblower" – Fred
"I.C. Water" – Psychic TV
"Me and My Ding Dong" – Pankow
"The Name Game (7" Version)" – Divine

References

External links
Black Box at Discogs

Record label compilation albums
1994 compilation albums
Industrial compilation albums
TVT Records compilation albums